CX28 is a radio station in Montevideo, in Uruguay. The station is owned and operated by FADITUR S.A. and broadcasts Catholic radio programming as an affiliate of The World Family of Radio Maria.

The station had previously been Radio Imparcial, a talk outlet. However, in 2018, it was sold by owner Sucesión Walfrido Figueira Morán S.R.L., prompting the end of its programs. The sale attracted questions about violations of Uruguay's broadcasting law, as the number of stations owned, if considered as one group, would have been impermissible.

Other Radio María stations
Radio María Uruguay is also heard on the following stations:

See also
Catholic Media Network
Radio Maria

References

External links
 
 1090 AM

Spanish-language radio stations
Radio in Uruguay
Mass media in Montevideo
Catholic radio stations
Catholic Church in Uruguay